Rodney or Rod Mason may refer to:

Rodney Mason, American actor, see Tanqueray#Advertising
Rodney Mason (rugby league), player for Central Coast Centurions
Colonel Rodney Mason, commander of 71st Ohio Infantry
Rod Mason (basketball) played in 1993 FIBA Americas
Rod Mason (musician) (1940–2017), English musician